The 2023 Women's Challenge Cup Final will be the 11th final of rugby league's Women's Challenge Cup knock-out competition. For the first time both the women's and men's final will take place at Wembley Stadium on the same day – 12 August 2023.

The 2023 finals marks the Women's Challenge Cup Final's debut at Wembley.

See also
2023 Men's Challenge Cup Final

Reference

RFL Women's Challenge Cup
Challenge Cup
rugby league
Challenge Cup